Chuzhou North railway station is a railway station in Langya District, Chuzhou, Anhui, China. It is an intermediate stop on the Beijing–Shanghai railway.

History
On 1 January 2006, a new ticket hall was opened. On 1 June 2011 the name of this station was changed from Chuzhou to Chuzhou North, in preparation for the opening of the new Chuzhou railway station on the Beijing–Shanghai high-speed railway.

See also
Chuzhou railway station

References 

Railway stations in Anhui